Hildegard Korf Kallmann-Bijl (September 18, 1908 – November 7, 1968) was a German-Jewish physicist who emigrated to the United States where she founded and was the first chair of Committee on Space Research (COSPAR).

Biography
Hildegard Korf was born in Gelsenkirchen, Germany, 1908. She studied philosophy at the University of Berlin, metallurgy at Technische Hochschule, and physics at University of California, Los Angeles (BS, 1945; MS, 1947, Ph.D., 1955). She was married twice, first to Curt Kallmann (divorce, 1957), whom she helped flee Germany in 1939 from persecution for his Jewish faith, and then to Jan Bijl. 

Kallmann-Bijl was employed by RAND Corporation (1953–64), was a guest professor at University of Utrecht (1964), and authored several papers. She served as a consultant to the United States Air Force and NASA, and was a member of the National Academy of Sciences.

Kallmann-Bijl's publications focused on models of molecular composition of the Earth's atmosphere. These models, forming what was named the "Kallmann Atmosphere" and detailed enough to include atmospheric ranges and Diurnal variation, could then be used to predict the lifespan of a satellite in orbit.

Kallmann-Bijl died of a heart attack in The Hague, Netherlands, November 7, 1968. Her papers are held by Leo Baeck Institute at the Center for Jewish History.

References

1908 births
1968 deaths
20th-century American physicists
20th-century German physicists
Jewish emigrants from Nazi Germany to the United States
Humboldt University of Berlin alumni
University of California, Los Angeles alumni
RAND Corporation people